Corybas montanus, commonly known as the montane helmet orchid, is a species of terrestrial orchid endemic to Queensland. It forms small colonies and has single heart-shaped to round leaf and a reddish, self-pollinating flower with a curved dorsal sepal. It is only known from the Mount Barney National Park in south-east Queensland.

Description
The leaf is bluish green with whitish veins on the upper surface and shiny greenish purple on the lower side. Flowering occurs in June and July.

Taxonomy
Corybas montanus was first formally described in 1988 by D.L.Jones and the description was published in Austrobaileya from a specimen collected on Mount Maroon. The specific epithet (montanus) is a Latin word meaning "of mountains", referring to the habitat of this species.

Distribution and habitat
The montane helmet orchid is self-pollinating and grows on slopes in open forest on Mount Maroon.

Conservation
Corybas montanus is classified as "vulnerable" under the Australian Government Environment Protection and Biodiversity Conservation Act 1999. The main potential threat to the species is illegal collection.

References

montanus
Endemic orchids of Australia
Orchids of Queensland
Plants described in 1988